General John Stuart Baker  (24 February 1936 – 9 July 2007) was a senior Australian Army officer. Entering the Royal Military College, Duntroon in 1954, his career culminated with his appointment as Chief of the Defence Force from 1995 to 1998, the most senior position in the Australian Defence Force. Baker also served as the inaugural Director of the Defence Intelligence Organisation from 1990 to 1992, Vice Chief of the Defence Force from 1992 to 1995, and was author of the highly influential 1988 "Baker Report".

Career 
Baker entered the Royal Military College, Duntroon in 1954. On graduation in 1957, he was allotted to the Royal Australian Engineers and later completing a degree in civil engineering at the University of Melbourne.

Baker's first regimental posting was a one-year appointment in Papua New Guinea, and not long after he spent a year in Hawaii as an exchange officer. In 1970–1971 he was attached to the 1st Australian Civil Affairs Unit during the Vietnam War, where he was Mentioned in Despatches. He was promoted to lieutenant colonel in 1971, colonel in 1979, brigadier in 1982, major general in 1987, lieutenant general in 1992 and general in 1995.

The Baker Report 
In 1987, the then Chief of the Defence Force, General Peter Gration, tasked the then Brigadier Baker to:  One of the principal aims of this study was to determine the optimal command arrangements for ADF air power. The final report, commonly referred to as the Baker Report, was published in March 1988. Despite extensive reference being made to the command and control challenges posed by air power, Baker did not provide definitive guidance on how the ADF should structure its command arrangements to optimise the development and employment of air power. However, Chapter 7 of the report strongly advocated the creation of NORCOM, a recommendation that was soon adopted by the ADF.

"The Baker Report" remains the seminal work on command and control in the ADF.

Honours and awards 

Baker was a Fellow of the Australian Academy of Technological Sciences and Engineering.

Portrait 
During General Baker's tenure as Chief of Defence Force, the Royal Australian Engineers arranged for his portrait to be painted by leading Australian 20th century artist, Sir William Dargie.  The portrait (1997) hangs at the RAE's School of Military Engineering in Sydney, but was also used at General Baker's funeral in Canberra at the Royal Military College, Duntroon in 2007.

General John Baker Complex – HQJOC 
On 7 March 2009 the Prime Minister of Australia, Kevin Rudd, officially opened the "General John Baker Complex", housing the Headquarters Joint Operations Command (HQJOC) from which joint command of the Australian Defence Force is exercised by the Chief of Joint Operations (CJOPS). The complex is some 25 km from the national capital, Canberra, on the Kings Highway about half-way between the towns of Queanbeyan and Bungendore. After Mr Rudd named the complex, Mrs Margaret Baker unveiled a bronze bust of General Baker. The bust was sculpted by Hal Holman.

References 

|-

|-

|-

1936 births
2007 deaths
Australian generals
Australian military personnel of the Vietnam War
Chiefs of the Defence Force (Australia)
Commanders of the Legion of Merit
Companions of the Order of Australia
Military personnel from Melbourne
People educated at Parade College
Recipients of the Centenary Medal
Recipients of the Darjah Utama Bakti Cemerlang (Tentera)
Recipients of the Distinguished Service Medal (Australia)
Recipients of the Philippine Legion of Honor
Royal Military College, Duntroon graduates
University of Melbourne alumni
Vice Chiefs of the Defence Force (Australia)
Fellows of the Australian Academy of Technological Sciences and Engineering
Australian military engineers